The Surrey County Council election, 2013 took place on 2 May 2013 as part of the 2013 United Kingdom local elections. 81 electoral divisions returned one county councillor each by first-past-the-post voting for a four-year term of office. Following a review, new electoral division boundaries were introduced for this election, increasing the number of councillors from 80 to 81.

All locally registered electors (British, Irish, Commonwealth and European Union citizens) who were aged 18 or over on Thursday 2 May 2013 were entitled to vote in the local elections. Those who were temporarily away from their ordinary address (for example, away working, on holiday, in student accommodation or in hospital) were also entitled to vote in the local elections, although those who had moved abroad and registered as overseas electors cannot vote in the local elections. It is possible to register to vote at more than one address (such as a university student who had a term-time address and lives at home during holidays) at the discretion of the local Electoral Register Office, but it remains an offence to vote more than once in the same local government election. The next election is scheduled for 4 May 2017.

Summary

Despite suffering the loss of 335 of 1451 councillors in simultaneous elections across England, the Conservative Party increased their majority on the council by two seats. Independent candidates and local residents' association groups won ten seats between them. The Liberal Democrats won 9 seats, losing four seats to the Conservatives). UKIP and the Green Party gained three seats and one seat respectively from the Conservatives to win their first representation on the council at this election. The Labour Party retained their only seat on the council.

Electoral Review
For these elections the number of seats in the Council increased from 80 to 81 implementing, with a minor change, recommendations of the 2010 review by the Local Government Boundary Commission for England. During the consultation the Council in November 2010 recommended no change to the number of councillors and most submissions recommended a reduction in the number of councillors, including a representation from Surrey Heath District Council to reduce the number of councillors to 60. However, when the Council drafted its boundary proposals it realised that allocation of 8 members to Waverley District would mean:

Therefore, although the threshold for electoral inequality is 10% variation from the average, which must be reached in 33% of divisions to trigger a boundary commission review, the Council relied in evidence on the fact that Waverley's projected electorate in 2016 would be the most disparate above the quota. Others were over-represented falling below the quota and opponents argued for instead, their removal. Determined to keep a minimum of 80 councillors, Surrey County Council stated that Waverley would be, in its view, unacceptably under-represented and so advocated 81 seats in its final, modified size submission of March 2011. The LGBCE accepted this argument.

The boundary review resulted generally to minor revisions all of which were only to a minority of divisions, with consequential name changes in a few instances.

Candidates
The only party which nominated candidates in all 81 divisions were UKIP, followed by the Conservative Party, who contested 80 divisions.  The Labour Party stood in 78 divisions and the Liberal Democrats contested 76 divisions.  None of the other parties fielded candidates in a majority of divisions, with the Green Party and Residents Associations both standing in 12 divisions. Eleven candidates stood as independents.

Results

|}

Results by district

Surrey County Council is split into 81 single-member electoral divisions.  These are grouped into 11 districts, each of which has between 6 and 10 divisions.

Elmbridge

Epsom and Ewell

Guildford

Mole Valley

Reigate and Banstead

Runnymede

Spelthorne

Surrey Heath

Tandridge

Waverley

Woking

References

2013 English local elections
2013
2010s in Surrey